Bouthaina al-Rimi is a Yemeni baby girl whose home in the Attan neighbourhood of Sanaa, the capital of Yemen, was bombed and destroyed on 25 August 2017 by a Saudi-led coalition air strike. The blast killed her parents and six siblings. Following her rescue, a photographer shared a picture of Bouthaina trying to open one of her swollen and bruised eyes. The picture has become an emblem for the toll the war in the Middle Eastern country is taking on its population. Since 2015. This picture is often associated with pictures of Omran Daqneesh and Alan Kurdi.

The Aftermath 
 As Bouthaina's picture went viral on the social media, Thousands of Yemenis uploaded photos of themselves with one eye closed and using a hand to open the other eye wider to show solidarity with the plight of Bouthaina.
 On September 1, 2017, former Yemeni president Ali Abdullah Saleh announced that he is adopting Bouthaina.
 The Arabic hashtag #Bouthaina_The_Eye_Of_Humanity and #I_SPEAK_FOR_BUTHINA have both been used more than 3,000 times within 24 hours since the bombing

See also 
 Yemen Civil War
 Omran Daqneesh
 Alan Kurdi

References 

Living people
People from Sanaa
Year of birth missing (living people)